The  track gauge, also called the Scotch gauge, was adopted by early 19th century railways mainly in the Lanarkshire area of Scotland. It differed from the gauge of  that was used on some early lines in England. In the early 1840s standard gauge lines began to be constructed in Scotland, and all the Scotch gauge lines were eventually converted to standard gauge. The building of new Scotch gauge railways was outlawed in Great Britain in 1846 by the Regulating the Gauge of Railways Act 1846. From 1903, tram lines of Tokyo adopted this gauge.

Scottish railways built to Scotch gauge

A small number of early to mid-19th century passenger railways were built to  Scotch gauge including:

Robert Stephenson and Company built a Scotch gauge locomotive, the St. Rollox, for the Garnkirk and Glasgow Railway; which was later sold to the Paisley and Renfrew Railway.

All the lines were later relaid in standard gauge.

Other early 19th century Scottish gauges

4 ft 6½ in gauge
They were:
 The Dundee and Newtyle Railway. Length: .
 The Newtyle and Coupar Angus Railway. Length: .
 The Newtyle and Glammis Railway. Length: .

5 ft 6 in gauge
Thomas Grainger is said to have chosen this gauge, since he regarded  as being too narrow and Isambard Kingdom Brunel's  as being too wide. They were:
 The Dundee and Arbroath Railway. Length: . Incorporated on 19 May 1836 and opened in part in October 1838.
 The Arbroath and Forfar Railway. Length: . Incorporated on 19 May 1836 and opened in part on 24 November 1838.

End of Scotch gauge
The Glasgow, Paisley, Kilmarnock and Ayr Railway and the Glasgow, Paisley and Greenock Railway, which both obtained Parliamentary Approval on 15 July 1837 and were later to become part of the Glasgow and South Western Railway and the Caledonian Railway, respectively, were built to standard gauge from the start.

The Lee Moor Tramway operated a Scotch Gauge line from 1899 to the early 1960s, with the two 0-4-0ST locomotives built by Peckett and Sons to there M4 Design. LEE MOOR No.1 (works number 783) is preserved at the Wheal Martyn Museum near St. Austell and LEE MOOR No.2 (works number 784) is preserved at the South Devon Railway, neither are operational. Both locomotives were originally preserved by the Lee Moor Tramway Preservation Group.

A few remnants of old lines remain, but are non functional with the exception of one example of the St Michael's Mount Tramway at St Michael's Mount in Cornwall. It is a partial underground railway that used to bring luggage up to the castle. It occasionally operates, but only for demonstration reasons and is not open to the general public, although a small stretch is visible at the harbour. It is therefore believed to be Britain's last functionally operational Scotch gauge railway.

Use in Japan

After the end of the Scotch gauge in Britain, the gauge was revived in Japan. Since 1903, most of the tram network in Tokyo was built with  rail gauge, called . The use of this gauge extended to other suburban lines that projected through services to the city tram. Although Tokyo has abolished its major tram network (except the Arakawa Line), as of 2009 the following lines still used this gauge:
 The Keiō Line and its branches (excluding the Inokashira Line). The reason to use 1372 mm in 1915 was to provide through service with the now-abolished Tokyo city tram. Length: . Commuter railways connecting Tokyo and its suburb operated by Keio Corporation.
 The Toei Shinjuku Line. Length: . One of rapid transit lines in Tokyo, built to provide through service with the Keiō Line. Originally the Ministry of Transport intended the Keiō Line to  convert to 1435 mm (so that the Shinjuku Line would have the same gauge as the Asakusa Line for maintenance convenience), but the service area as of late 20th century was too densely populated to risk a massive disruption of the Keiō service, and the Shinjuku Line was constructed in 1372 mm instead.
 The Toden Arakawa Line. Length: . Only surviving line of Tokyo municipal tram.
 The Tōkyū Setagaya Line. Length: . Another tram line in Tokyo operated by Tokyu Corporation.
 The Hakodate City Tram. Length: . Only user of the gauge outside the Greater Tokyo Area.

See also

 Narrow gauge railway
 Standard gauge
 Tram track gauge

References

 Thomas, John (1971). A Regional History of the Railways of Great Britain. Volume 6 Scotland: The Lowlands and the Borders. Newton Abbott: David & Charles. .

Track gauges by name
 
 
Rail transport in Scotland
Economic history of Scotland
History of North Lanarkshire
19th century in Scotland
Scottish inventions
Narrow gauge railways in Scotland